Bedadi may refer to one of the following:

Bedadi, Ethiopia, village in south-western Ethiopia
Bedadi, Pakistan, village in North-West Frontier Province, Pakistan